Xun Fangying was the defending champion but chose not to participate.

Miyu Kato won the title, defeating Yuriko Miyazaki in the final, 6–4, 2–6, 6–2.

Seeds

Draw

Finals

Top half

Bottom half

References

External Links
Main Draw

Shimadzu All Japan Indoor Tennis Championships - Singles